August Becker (27 January 1821, Darmstadt - 19 December 1887, Düsseldorf) was a German landscape painter; associated with the Düsseldorfer Malerschule.

Life and work 
He began his studies in 1837, with the court painter, Johann Heinrich Schilbach. His first study trips took him through Fischbachtal, Rüdesheim and the Nahe region. In 1840, he attended the landscape painting classes taught by Johann Wilhelm Schirmer at the Kunstakademie Düsseldorf. He remained there after completing his courses, because Düsseldorf provided a profitable market for his art.

In 1854, he stayed in London for several weeks to study the museums. His brother, had been serving there as a librarian and Royal Tutor since 1851. A meeting was arranged with Prince Albert, who purchased Becker's painting "The Jungfrau", as a gift for Queen Victoria. In the years to come, she acquired more paintings and, in 1864, invited him to visit Scotland. In 1869, he paid a brief visit to her estate, Osborne House, on the Isle of Wight.

He later toured Hungary (1876) and Romania (1882), where his visit was related to commissions he had received from the Hohenzollern-Sigmaringen family. While there, he also gave painting lessons to Princess Antonia.

His total oeuvre comprises over 360 paintings, about 80 of which are in England.

References

Further reading 
"Becker, August", In: Allgemeines Lexikon der Bildenden Künstler von der Antike bis zur Gegenwart, Vol. 3: Bassano–Bickham, Wilhelm Engelmann, Leipzig, 1909 (Online)
 
 Lotte Hoffmann-Kuhnt (Ed.): August Becker (1821–1887). Das Leben eines Landschaftsmalers. Reiseberichte und Briefe, Schwaig, 2001, 
 Raimond Selke: August Becker (1821–1887): Der Darmstädter Landschaftsmaler aus der Düsseldorfer Schule. Biographie und Werkkatalog, Görres, Koblenz 2005,

External links 

 
 

19th-century German painters
Düsseldorf school of painting
German male painters
1821 births
1887 deaths
19th-century German male artists